Arbroath East and Lunan is one of the eight wards used to elect members of the Angus Council. It elects three Councillors.

Councillors

Election Results

2022 Election
2022 Angus Council election

2017 Election
2017 Angus Council election

2016 By-election

2012 Election
2012 Angus Council election

2007 Election
2007 Angus Council election

References

Wards of Angus